The Columbus Museum in Columbus, Georgia was founded in 1953. It contains many artifacts on both American art and regional history, displayed in both its permanent collection as well as temporary exhibitions. It is accredited by the American Alliance of Museums. Former curator and director, Joseph B. Mahan, Jr., was instrumental in the creation of the Institute for the Study of American Cultures in 1983.

References

External links
 Official website

Museums in Columbus, Georgia
Institutions accredited by the American Alliance of Museums
History museums in Georgia (U.S. state)
Art museums and galleries in Georgia (U.S. state)